Lorenz Nieberl (sometimes spelled as Lorenz Niebert; 7 July 1919, in Munich, Germany – 12 April 1968) was a West German bobsledder who competed in the early 1950s. At the 1952 Winter Olympics in Oslo, he became the first person to win both the two-man and four-man competitions at the same Winter Olympics. Nieberl also finished sixth in the four-man event at the 1956 Winter Olympics in Cortina d'Ampezzo.

He also won four medals at the FIBT World Championships with two golds (Two-man and four-man: both 1951) and two bronzes (Two-man: 1953, Four-man: 1954).

References
 Bobsleigh four-man Olympic medalists for 1924, 1932–56, and since 1964
 Bobsleigh two-man world championship medalists since 1931
 Bobsleigh four-man world championship medalists since 1930
 
 Wallechinsky, David. (1984). "Bobsled: Four-man." In The Complete Book of the Olympics: 1896–1980. New York: Penguin Books. p. 561.

External links
 
 

1919 births
1968 deaths
Sportspeople from Munich
German male bobsledders
Bobsledders at the 1952 Winter Olympics
Bobsledders at the 1956 Winter Olympics
Olympic bobsledders of Germany
Olympic bobsledders of the United Team of Germany
Olympic gold medalists for Germany
Olympic medalists in bobsleigh
Medalists at the 1952 Winter Olympics